Adam Boyes may refer to:
 Adam Boyes (footballer)
 Adam Boyes (entrepreneur)